Photharam is a district (amphoe) in the northern part of Ratchaburi province, western Thailand.

History
Photharam was a district (khwaeng) of Mueang Ratchaburi in the 19th century. In 1836 the district office was relocated from the mouth of Bang Tanod canal to the east bank of the Mae Klong River opposite Wat Chaloem Art. On 10 March 1952 it was moved to its present location in the municipality of Photharam.

Geography
Neighboring districts are (from the east clockwise) Bang Phae, Damnoen Saduak, Mueang Ratchaburi, and Chom Bueng of Ratchaburi Province; Tha Muang of Kanchanaburi province; Ban Pong of Ratchaburi Province; and Mueang Nakhon Pathom of Nakhon Pathom province.

The important water resource is the Mae Klong River.

Administration
The district is divided into 19 sub-districts (tambons), which are further subdivided into 156 villages (mubans). There are six municipal (thesaban) areas. The town (thesaban mueang) Photharam covers tambon Photaram. The townships (thesaban tambon) Ban Lueak, Ban Sing, and Chet Samian each cover the same-named tambons completely. The township Khao Khuang covers tambon Nang Kaeo and parts of Chamrae, Tao Pun, and Khao Cha-ngum. Township Nong Pho covers parts of tambon Nong Pho. There are a further 14 tambon administrative organizations (TAO).

References

External links
 Photharam district history

Photharam